A Bachelor's Baby is a 1922 British silent comedy film directed by Arthur Rooke and starring Constance Worth, Malcolm Tod and Tom Reynolds.

Cast
 Constance Worth as Peggy Woodward  
 Malcolm Tod as Lieutenant Jimmy Barton  
 Tom Reynolds as Captain Rogers  
 Haidee Wright as Miss Fisher  
 Maud Yates as Mrs. Prowse

References

Bibliography
 Low, Rachael. History of the British Film, 1918-1929. George Allen & Unwin, 1971.

External links
 

1922 films
British comedy films
British silent feature films
Films directed by Arthur Rooke
British black-and-white films
1922 comedy films
1920s English-language films
1920s British films
Silent comedy films